The 1956 FIVB Women's World Championship was the second edition of the tournament, contested by the senior women's national teams of the members of the  (FIVB), the sport's global governing body. It was held from 30 August to 12 September 1956 in France.

Teams

  (debut)
  (debut)
  (debut)
 
  (debut)
  (debut)
  (debut)
  (host)
  (debut)
  (debut)
  (debut)
  (debut)
 
 
  (reigning champion)
  (debut)
  (debut)

Squads

Source:

Venues

Format
The tournament was played in two different stages (first and final rounds). A single round-robin format was played within each group to determine the teams group position, all teams progressed to the next round.

A single round-robin format was played within each group with matches already played between teams in the  also counted in this round.

Pools composition

Results

First round

Pool A

|}

|}

Pool B

|}

|}

Pool C

|}

|}

Pool D

|}

|}

Pool E

|}

|}

Final round
The results and the points of the matches between the same teams that were already played during the first round are taken into account for the final round.

11th–17th places

|}

|}

Final places

|}

|}

Final standing

References

External links
 FIVB Results
 Results - todor66
 Results
 Federation Internationale de Volleyball

Fivb Women's World Championship
Fivb Women's World Championship 1956
1956
Fivb Volleyball Women's World Championship
Fivb Women's World Championship 1956
Fivb World Championship 1956
Fivb Volleyball Women's World Championship
Fivb Volleyball Women's World Championship
Fivb Volleyball Women's World Championship
Fivb Volleyball Women's World Championship 1956